Danny Hall (born November 27, 1954) is the head baseball coach of the Georgia Tech Yellow Jackets.  He has been the head coach of Georgia Tech since 1994. Before coming to Tech, he held positions at Miami (OH), Michigan, and Kent State. From 1978 to 1979, he coached at Miami (OH), where he compiled a 69–26 (.726) record. From 1980 to 1987, he coached at Michigan, where he compiled a 368–111–1 record as an assistant coach. From 1988 to 1993, he coached at Kent State, where he compiled a 208–117(.640) record.

Hall's accomplishments put him in the annals of all-time great Georgia Tech coaches.  He has compiled an 1140–605–1 record, has led Tech to post-season play 23 out of 28 full seasons, and has taken Tech to its only College World Series appearances in 1994, 2000, and 2006. From 2004 to 2006, Tech has led the ACC with a 74–38 conference record. Hall's 1,140 wins as head coach make him the winningest head coach in all of Tech sports history.  This includes a school-record 52 wins in 2002. Hall is the only current head coach at Tech with a winning record in its rivalry with Georgia, known as Clean, Old-Fashioned Hate.

Personal
Hall is married to Kara, with whom he has three sons, Danny, Carter and Colin. Carter was selected in the 34th round of the 2015 MLB draft, but chose not to sign and attended Georgia Tech.

Head coaching record

See also
List of current NCAA Division I baseball coaches
List of college baseball coaches with 1,100 wins

References

External links

 Georgia Tech profile

1954 births
Living people
Georgia Tech Yellow Jackets baseball coaches
Kent State Golden Flashes baseball coaches
Miami RedHawks baseball coaches
Michigan Wolverines baseball coaches
Miami RedHawks baseball players